Secret is a four-member South Korean girl group formed by TS Entertainment in 2009. Secret debuted with the song "I Want You Back" on October 13, 2009. In 2010, the group released their hit single "Magic" which was nominated at the 12th Mnet Asian Music Awards for Best Dance Performance by a Female Group. The same year, the group released their number one hit single "Madonna" which won them a Bonsang award at the 20th Seoul Music Awards. With the success of "Magic" and "Madonna", the group received the "Newcomer award" at the 25th Golden Disk Awards.

"Shy Boy" earned the group's first win in Mnet's M! Countdown and SBS's Inkigayo. The song was their first Triple Crown in KBS's Music Bank and garnered them multiple awards and nominations. The song was nominated for Song of the Year and Best Dance Performance by a Female Group at the 13th Mnet Asian Music Awards. The song won a Bonsang award at the 21st Seoul Music Awards and at the 3rd Melon Music Awards. The song also won the Songs of the Year Award at the 1st Gaon Chart Awards for the month of January. Following the success of "Shy Boy", Secret released Starlight Moonlight in June 2011. The song earned them their second win in Inkigayo and won them a Digital Bonsang award at the 26th Golden Disk Award. In 2012, "Starlight Moonlight" won the Songs of the Year Award in the 1st Gaon Chart Awards for the month of June.

Major awards

Asia Model Awards 

The Asia Model Awards is an award show that honors people who have excelled in the entertainment industry such as in music, modelling, movies and dramas. In 2011, Secret won the "Popular Singer Award" at the 2011 Asia Model Awards.

Gaon Chart Awards 

The Gaon Chart Awards is a major music award show that is held annually in South Korea by the music portal Gaon Chart. The award show is reported to differentiate themselves from other music awards in that it will focus more on songs and albums rather than musicians. Secret has won two awards.

Golden Disk Awards 

The Golden Disk Awards is an award show founded in 1986 that is presented annually by the Music Industry Association of Korea for outstanding achievements in the music industry in South Korea. It is dubbed as the Korean Grammy Awards. Secret has been nominated four times and has won two awards.

Note: In South Korea, a bonsang award is given to the top 10 best performing artists, albums or singles during that year.

Korean Culture Entertainment Awards 

The Korean Culture Entertainment Awards  was first held in 1992 with the purpose of improving the quality of Korean culture and art, as well as promoting and developing local cultural content. Secret won the "New Generation Popular Teen Singer Award" in 2010.

Melon Music Awards 

The Melon Music Awards is a major music award show that is held annually in South Korea. It is known for only calculating digital sales and online votes to judge winners. Secret has been nominated three times and has won one award.

Note: In South Korea, a bonsang award is given to the top 10 best performing artists, albums or singles during that year.

Mnet Asian Music Awards 

The Mnet Asian Music Awards is a major music award show that is held by Mnet Media annually in South Korea, involving the participation of some of the most well-known actors and singers. Secret has been nominated three times.

Seoul Music Awards 

The Seoul Music Awards is an award show founded in 1990 that is presented annually by the Sports Seoul for outstanding achievements in the music industry in South Korea. Secret has won three awards.

Note: In South Korea, a bonsang award is given to the top 10 best performing artists, albums or singles during that year.

Other awards

SBS MTV Best of the Best Awards

See also
Secret discography
Secret videography
List of songs by Secret

Notes

References 

Secret (South Korean band)
Secret